Naho Sato (born 23 January 2001) is a Japanese tennis player.

Sato has been ranked as high as 530 in singles and world No. 430 in doubles by the Women's Tennis Association (WTA). On the ITF Junior Circuit, Naito's career-high ranking is world No. 7 (March 2018).

In 2018, she was runner-up in the junior women's doubles at Roland Garros, along with her compatriot Yuki Naito , after losing the final against the American Caty McNally and the Polish Iga Świątek.

At the 2018 Youth Olympic Games held in Buenos Aires, Argentina, she won the silver medal in women's doubles, along with Naito. In the women's doubles final, Naito and Sato were defeated by the Slovenian Kaja Juvan and the Polish Iga Świątek, who competed in the mixed team modality owned by the Youth Olympians.

At the 2019 Summer Universiade held in Naples, Italy, she won the gold medal in women's singles and a bronze medal in women's doubles, along with Kanako Morisaki.

ITF Circuit finals

Singles: 3 (2 titles, 1 runner up)

Doubles: 10 (7 titles, 3 runner ups)

Junior Grand Slam tournament finals

Doubles: 1 (runner-up)

Notes

References

External links
 
 

2001 births
Living people
Japanese female tennis players
Tennis players at the 2018 Summer Youth Olympics
Universiade medalists in tennis
Universiade gold medalists for Japan
Universiade bronze medalists for Japan
Medalists at the 2019 Summer Universiade
21st-century Japanese women